Fryazino is a rural locality (a village) in Vyatkinskoye Rural Settlement, Sudogodsky District, Vladimir Oblast, Russia. The population was 29 as of 2010.

Geography 
Fryazino is located 48 km northwest of Sudogda (the district's administrative centre) by road. Korostelevo is the nearest rural locality.

References 

Rural localities in Sudogodsky District